Zorro is a puzzle-platform game written by James Garon and published by Datasoft in 1985. Versions were released for the Apple II, Atari 8-bit family, Commodore 64, and Amstrad CPC. A ZX Spectrum port was published in 1986 by U.S. Gold.

Gameplay

The player's task is, as the title character, to get to the heavily guarded fort and free his beloved from the clutches of the evil Sergeant Garcia. Gameplay is very similar to another Datasoft platformer - Bruce Lee, however Zorro has a slower pace and more puzzles. These mainly involve collecting items from a specific room in the city, then carrying them and using them in the appropriate place (such as heating up a branding iron in a fireplace and using it on a bull). The game features 20 different locations, including catacombs under the city, an underground lake, and The Ole Hotel.

Reception

Zorro received mixed reviews. In 1986, Julian Rignall wrote in Zzap!, "If you like this sort of game then you could well be pleased with this, but if you like your action a little faster and hotter then you might find yourself bored playing Zorro." The game was also reviewed in Computer and Video Games: "Graphically this rather standard platform game is not over impressive."

References

External links
Zorro at Atari Mania

1985 video games
Apple II games
Amstrad CPC games
Atari 8-bit family games
Commodore 64 games
Datasoft games
Puzzle-platform games
U.S. Gold games
Video games based on Zorro
Video games developed in the United States
ZX Spectrum games
Video games set in California
Single-player video games